The 1959–60 season was the 58th in the history of the Western Football League.

The champions for the first time in their history were Torquay United Reserves, and the winners of Division Two were Welton Rovers. This season was the last to feature two divisions until 1976–77; many clubs left the league at the end of the season and the league was reduced to one division for 1960–61.

Division One
Division One remained at nineteen clubs after Frome Town were relegated the previous season, Cinderford Town left, and two clubs joined:

Bath City Reserves, champions of Division Two
Trowbridge Town Reserves, runners-up in Division Two

Division Two
Division Two was reduced from seventeen clubs to fourteen after Bath City Reserves and Trowbridge Town Reserves were promoted to Division One, Hoffman Athletic and Ilfracombe Town left, and one new club joined:

Frome Town, relegated from Division One.

References

1959-60
5